Savant Systems Inc. is a home automation company headquartered in Hyannis, Massachusetts, United States. The company was founded in 2005 and is privately held. It has 200 employees at its headquarters and a further 700 through its subsidiary GE Lighting.

Savant Systems is the parent company of GE Lighting, which it bought from General Electric in May 2020. Neither company disclosed the price but the Wall Street Journal reported that it was $250 million. GE Lighting employs 700 people at the historic Nela Park in East Cleveland, Ohio.

In 2014 the private equity company KKR invested $90 million in Savant Systems, valuing the company at $200 million at the time.

References

2005 establishments in Massachusetts
2020 mergers and acquisitions
American companies established in 2005
Electronics companies established in 2005